Muhammad Waheed (born 15 October 2002) is a Pakistani footballer who currently plays for Khan Research Laboratories in the Pakistan Premier League, and the Pakistani national team.

Club career
Waheed began his career with local clubs Pakistan Civil Aviation Authority and Sui Northern Gas Pipelines Limited. He has consistently been among the top goal-scorers in the local league.

In late 2022 Waheed moved to Khan Research Laboratories. He soon made an impact, scoring two goals in a victory over Pakistan Army F.C. in the 2023 National Challenge Cup.

International career
Waheed represented Pakistan at the youth level in 2020 AFC U-19 Championship qualification. He went on to score two goals in four appearances. His goals came in a 1–2 defeat to Kuwait and a 1–5 defeat to Palestine.

In late 2019 Waheed was included in Pakistan's 13-man squad for the Socca World Cup in Greece. He was the youngest player on any squad in the six-a-side tournament. In preparation for the tournament, he scored in a 2–1 friendly victory over Colombia. In the team's Group Stage match against Germany, he scored both of his team's goals in the 2–3 defeat.

In August 2022 Waheed was called up for trials with the senior national team. In November the same year, he was included in Pakistan's squad for a friendly against Nepal, Pakistan's first fixture in nearly three-and-a-half years because of the Pakistan Football Federation's suspension by FIFA. He made his senior international debut as a second-half substitute in the eventual 0–1 away defeat. 

Waheed was called up to the senior squad again in February 2023 in preparation for upcoming friendlies, the 2023 SAFF Championship, and 2026 FIFA World Cup qualification.

International career statistics

Youth international goals
Scores and results list Pakistan's goal tally first.

Personal life
Waheed is from the Malir District of Karachi.

References

External links
National Football Teams profile

Living people
2002 births
Pakistani footballers
Pakistan international footballers
Association football forwards